María Urbina (born 9 May 1968) is a Mexican butterfly swimmer. She competed in two events at the 1984 Summer Olympics.

References

External links
 

1968 births
Living people
Mexican female butterfly swimmers
Olympic swimmers of Mexico
Swimmers at the 1984 Summer Olympics
Place of birth missing (living people)